Justyn Węglorz (born 27 May 1958) is a Polish former basketball player. He competed in the men's tournament at the 1980 Summer Olympics.

References

1958 births
Living people
Polish men's basketball players
Olympic basketball players of Poland
Basketball players at the 1980 Summer Olympics
People from Rybnik
Sportspeople from Silesian Voivodeship